The allelengyon was a tax established in 1002 by the Byzantine Emperor Basil II, requiring the wealthiest landowners to pay the tax debts owed by their poorer neighbours. It relied on a concept long extant in Hellenistic and Byzantine law, but was abolished by Romanos III Argyros in 1028.

Background
The term allelengye (ἀλληλεγύη, "mutual guarantee/security") is first attested in papyri from Oxyrhynchus and identifies a joint guarantee over a debt or another fiscal obligation. By the early Byzantine period (4th–7th centuries), it had become a Greek equivalent of the Latin term fideiussio. According to a novella of Justinian I, there were two types, one of limited liability among the co-sureties and one of unlimited liability for any and all fiscal and legal responsibilities arising. In the usage of 9th- and 10th-century texts, its meaning had shifted slightly to replace the previous term epibole in describing the collective tax obligation among rural communities, a Hellenistic fiscal principle for rapid and constant revenuee: thus in the legislation of Nikephoros I a community had to cover collectively for any of its poorer members who were currently in military service and unable to pay, and later legislation extended this to the obligations of any peasants who had fled the land.

Basil II's law
In 1002, Emperor Basil II instituted the allelengyon as a specific law, which obliged the wealthier landholders (the dynatoi) to cover for the arrears of the poorer tax-payers. Its exact provisions are unknown, but the law proved unpopular with the wealthier sections of society. Pressure from the Church led to its cancellation in 1028, by Romanos III Argyros. However, the term appears in the sources as late as the turn of the 12th century, when the future Patriarch of Constantinople Nicholas Mouzalon accused tax collectors of still applying the allelengyon to extract taxes from peasants.

References

Sources
 

Basil II
Byzantine law
Land taxation
Public liability
1000s in the Byzantine Empire
Taxation in the Byzantine Empire
11th century in law